Victor Henry (17 August 1850 in Colmar, Alsace6 February 1907 in Sceaux) was a French philologist, specializing in Indian languages.

Biography
Having held appointments at the University of Douai and the University of Lille, Henry was appointed professor of Sanskrit and comparative grammar at the University of Paris. A prolific and versatile writer, he is probably best known by the English translations of his Précis de Grammaire comparée de l'anglais et de l'allemand and Précis de Grammaire comparée du Grec et du Latin.

Important works by him on India and Indian languages are:
 Manuel pour étudier le Sanscrit védique (with Abel Bergaigne, 1890)
 Éléments de Sanscrit classique (1902)
 Précis de grammaire Pâlie (1904)
 Les Littératures de l'Inde: sanscrit, Pâli, Prâcrit (1904)
 La Magie dans l'Inde antique (1904)
 Le Parsisme (1905)
 L'Agniṣṭoma (1906; with Willem Caland)

Native American languages (such as Siglit, Quechua, and Greenlandic) and minority languages of France (Lexique Étymologique du Breton moderne on Breton; Le Dialecte Alaman de Colmar on Alemannic) also claimed his attention.

Le Langage martien is a curious book. It contains a discussion of some 40 phrases (amounting to about 500 words), which a certain Mademoiselle Hélène Smith (a well-known spiritualist medium of Geneva), while on a hypnotic visit to the planet Mars, learnt and repeated and even wrote down during her trance as specimens of a language spoken there, explained to her by a disembodied interpreter.

References

External links
 

French philologists
1850 births
1907 deaths